Baan Baa, pronounced "barn-bar", is a village located in northern inland New South Wales, Australia in Narrabri Shire local government area and Pottinger County. It is approximately 38 kilometres south-east of Narrabri and 58 km north-west of Gunnedah on the Kamilaroi Highway.

History

Baan Baa is named after a local property of the same name, and is aboriginal for "swim away". The railway line between Boggabri and Narrabri South Junction (which included the future township of Baan Baa) was opened on 1 October 1882. The railway station at Baan Baa opened in 1883. The Baan Baa Post Office opened on 9 February 1885 and closed on 19 March 1988. 
The Baan Baa Literary Institute building which constructed of local cypress pine timber, was erected in 1923, and is now the local community hall. Baan Baa was once a bustling railway village, which once had its own bakery, butchery and service station. The village now serves primarily a grain rail terminal. Baan Baa once had the longest railway platform in country New South Wales.

Industry

It is a central delivery point for wheat and barley grown in the surrounding districts including Harparary, Maules Creek, and Turrawan. 
Beef cattle and prime lamb raising together with cotton growing are other important agricultural products of the district. Coal mining is becoming a major industry in the Baan Baa area, with gas exploration also expanding in the nearby Pilliga Scrub.

Recreation

The town has a strong tradition of sport, fielding a strong combined team with Maules Creek in the Boggabri Cricket Competition and also tennis competitions.

A focal point of the community is the Railway Hotel, particularly during the harvest period in November and December each year. Church services are regularly conducted in the local church.

References

External links

Towns in New South Wales
Narrabri Shire